Maharashtra National Law University may refer to one of three universities: 

 Maharashtra National Law University, Aurangabad
 Maharashtra National Law University, Mumbai
 Maharashtra National Law University, Nagpur